The enzyme tyrosine phenol-lyase catalyzes the chemical reaction

L-tyrosine + H2O  phenol + pyruvate + NH3

This enzyme belongs to the family of lyases, specifically in the "catch-all" class of carbon-carbon lyases.  The systematic name of this enzyme class is L-tyrosine phenol-lyase (deaminating; pyruvate-forming). Other names in common use include beta-tyrosinase, and L-tyrosine phenol-lyase (deaminating).  This enzyme participates in tyrosine metabolism and nitrogen metabolism.  It employs one cofactor, pyridoxal phosphate.

Structural studies

References

 
 

EC 4.1.99
Pyridoxal phosphate enzymes
Enzymes of known structure